Brian Fitzgerald may refer to:

Brian Fitzgerald (academic), Australian academic and barrister
Brian Fitzgerald (baseball) (born 1976), former U.S. Major league baseball relief pitcher
Brian Fitzgerald (footballer) (1927–2013), Australian rules footballer
Brian Fitzgerald (politician) (born 1947), Irish Labour Party and independent politician